Ziarat Rural District is a rural district (dehestan) in the Central District of Shirvan County, North Khorasan Province, Iran. At the 2006 census, its population was 14,277, in 3,414 families.  The rural district has 15 villages.

References 

Rural Districts of North Khorasan Province
Shirvan County